William Herbert "Hank" Ritter (October 12, 1893 – September 3, 1964) was a professional baseball pitcher. He played all or part of four seasons in Major League Baseball, between 1912 and 1916, for the Philadelphia Phillies and New York Giants.

Sources

Albright Lions baseball players
Major League Baseball pitchers
Philadelphia Phillies players
New York Giants (NL) players
Wilmington Chicks players
Scranton Miners players
Juniata Eagles baseball players
Toronto Maple Leafs (International League) players
Rochester Hustlers players
Baseball players from Pennsylvania
1893 births
1964 deaths